The 37th Anti-Aircraft Brigade was an air defence formation of Britain's Territorial Army (TA) formed just before the outbreak of the Second World War. It was engaged in defending the Thames Estuary during the war, and continued to form part of Anti-Aircraft Command in the postwar era.

Origin

As international tensions rose in the late 1930s, Britain's Anti-Aircraft (AA) defences were strengthened with new Royal Artillery (RA) regiments. 37th AA Brigade was raised on 1 May 1938, with its HQ at Edmonton in North London, to control some of these AA units in the London area. It was commanded by Brigadier Edward William Gravatt Wilson, MC, appointed 29 September 1938, who after he left in 1940 went on to be AA Defence Commander (AADC)  Egypt. In 1939 37th AA Brigade joined the newly formed 6th AA Division based at Uxbridge, which had responsibility for air defence of the Thames Estuary, Essex and North Kent, and the approaches to London.

Order of Battle 1939
On formation, 37th AA Bde had the following composition:

 59th (The Essex Regiment) AA Regiment, RA  – converted in 1935 from 5th Bn Essex Regiment
 HQ at Walthamstow
 164th Anti-Aircraft Battery at Walthamstow
 167th Anti-Aircraft Battery at Leyton
 265th Anti-Aircraft Battery at Whipps Cross – newly-raised before 3 September 1939
 61st (Middlesex) AA Regiment, RA – converted in 1935 from 11th Battalion, the London Regiment (Finsbury Rifles)
 HQ at Pentonville
 170th Anti-Aircraft Battery at Finchley
 171st Anti-Aircraft Battery at Pentonville
 195th Anti-Aircraft Battery at Finchley – newly-raised before 3 September 1939
 79th (Hertfordshire Yeomanry) AA Regiment, RA – converted in 1938 from 343 (Watford) Field Battery from 86th (East Anglian) (Hertfordshire Yeomanry) Field Regt, RA) 
 HQ at Watford
 246th (1st Watford) Anti-Aircraft Battery
 247th (2nd Watford) Anti-Aircraft Battery
 248th (Welwyn) Anti-Aircraft Battery at Welwyn Garden City
 82nd (Essex) AA Regiment, RA – raised in 1938
 HQ at Barking
 156th (Barking) Anti-Aircraft Battery – transferred from 52nd (London) AA Regiment, RA
 193rd Anti-Aircraft Battery at  Leigh-on-Sea –transferred from 59th (Essex) AA Regiment
 256th (Barking) Anti-Aircraft Battery – newly raised before 3 September 1939
 37th AA Bde Company Royal Army Service Corps

Mobilisation
Anti-Aircraft Command, which had been formed within the Territorial Army earlier in the year, mobilised in late August 1939 and was at its stations before war was declared on 3 September. By then, a further newly formed regiment had been added to 37th AA Bde's order of battle:
 90th AA Regiment, RA
 HQ at Southgate, London
 272nd Anti-Aircraft Battery
 284th Anti-Aircraft Battery
 285th Anti-Aircraft Battery

Phoney War
37th AA Bde deployed and operated a layout from Dagenham to Thorpe Bay in Essex, along the north side of the Thames Estuary, known as 'Thames North'. Thames North had a planned layout of 20 HAA sites, of which only half were occupied by September 1940. It also contained a number of Vital Points (VPs) where LAA guns were deployed, including Purfleet (ammunition stores, including the entire AA ammunition supply for the London area), Tilbury (docks), Thameshaven and Coryton Refinery (oil refineries), and a major fighter airfield at RAF Hornchurch. All equipment was short, especially 40 mm Bofors guns for the LAA sites: Purfleet started the war with one quadruple Vickers gun, later receiving five Bofors batteries.

Opportunities for action were rare during the Phoney War, but on the night of 22/23 November 1939 the HAA guns of 37 AA Bde ('Thames North') combined with those of 28 (Thames & Medway) AA Bde on the other bank of the river ('Thames South') to engage at least two enemy mine-laying aircraft that had strayed into the mouth of the Estuary. One wrecked aircraft was found on the marshes.

On 26 December 1939, 79th (Hertfordshire Yeomanry) HAA Rgt was ordered to prepare to proceed overseas as a Base Defence Regiment for the British Expeditionary Force. The regiment was withdrawn from AA Command on 16 January 1940 and in February and March it was deployed around Le Havre. A fortnight after the Dunkirk evacuation, the regiment was evacuated from St Nazaire. It did not return to 37 AA Bde.

In April 1940, 82nd (Essex) AA Rgt was detached from the brigade and served in the Norway Campaign; after evacuation from Norway it was sent to join the garrison of Gibraltar.

In the summer of 1940, all the RA units equipped with the older 3-inch or newer 3.7-inch AA guns were designated as Heavy AA (HAA) regiments to distinguish them from the newer Light AA (LAA) regiments appearing in the order of battle.

Battle of Britain
By 11 July 1940, the Thames North AA layout operated by 37 AA Bde had a total of 46 HAA guns (3.7-inch and 4.5-inch).

The brigade was heavily engaged throughout the Battle of Britain. On 22 August, for example, a mass raid flew up the Thames Estuary to attack RAF Hornchurch on the Essex shore: the raid was broken up by 37 and 28 AA Bdes, and then the fighters of No. 11 Group RAF attacked. Follow-up raids were marked for the fighters by 'pointer' rounds of HAA fire. On 2 September another mass raid arrived over the Medway and flew up the Thames towards Hornchurch. They came under heavy fire from the 3.7s and 4.5s of 28 and 37 AA Bdes and 15 were shot down before the fighters took over. On 7 September heavy raids up the estuary attacked oil wharves at Thameshaven, Tilbury Docks and Woolwich Arsenal: a total of 25 aircraft were destroyed by AA guns and fighters.

On 15 September, remembered as the climax of the battle, 220 bombers attacked London in the morning despite heavy casualties inflicted by the RAF fighters. More attacks came in the afternoon and the AA guns around London, particularly 37 AA Bde, were continuously in action. Between the guns and fighters, the Luftwaffe lost 85 aircraft that day, an unsustainable rate of loss.

The Blitz
After 15 September the intensity of Luftwaffe day raids declined rapidly, and it began a prolonged night bombing campaign over London and industrial towns (The Blitz). This meant that 37 AA Bde was in action night after night as the bomber streams approached the London Inner Artillery Zone, but even with the assistance of searchlights (S/Ls), the effectiveness of HAA fire and fighters was greatly diminished in the darkness.

Order of Battle 1940–41
During the Battle of Britain and subsequent London Blitz, 37 AA Bde had the following order of battle.
 59 HAA Rgt – as above; to 28 AA Bde summer 1941
 61 HAA Rgt – as above; left summer 1941
 75th (Home Counties) (Cinque Ports) HAA Rgt, RA (part) – converted in 1938 from 59th (Home Counties) (Cinque Ports) Field Rgt, RA; to 10th AA Division Spring 1941; rejoined summer 1941
 HQ at Dover
 223rd (Kent) HAA Battery
 224th (Cinque Ports) HAA Battery
 306th HAA Battery
 422 HAA Bty joined in Summer 1941
 121st HAA Rgt, RA – joined after February 1941; to 29 (East Anglian) AA Bde May 1941
 385 HAA Bty
 387, 388 HAA Btys – attached direct to 37 AA Bde
 17th LAA Rgt, RA – to 12th AA Division Autumn 1941
 HQ at Chelsea, London
 48th LAA Battery at Chelsea
 49th LAA Battery at Purfleet
 50th LAA Battery at Shellhaven
 2nd LAA Rgt, Royal Canadian Artillery – attached from 1st Canadian Division assembling in the UK
 5th LAA Rgt, RCA – attached by February 1941, before joining 4th Canadian Division

Mid-War
The Blitz ended in May 1941, but occasional raids continued. Newly-formed AA units joined the division, the HAA units increasingly being 'mixed' ones into which women of the Auxiliary Territorial Service were integrated. At the same time, experienced units were posted away for service overseas. By December 1941, 37 AA Bde only had 75 HAA Rgt under its command. However, 29 (East Anglian) AA Bde, which had controlled 6 AA Division's S/L and LAA units in Essex, was disbanded in February 1942 and 37 AA Bde took over its responsibilities as far north as The Naze. This continual turnover of units, which accelerated in 1942 with the preparations for Operation Torch and the need to relocate guns to counter the Baedeker Blitz and the Luftwaffes hit-and-run attacks against South Coast towns.Order of Battle of Non-Field Force Units in the United Kingdom, Part 27: AA Command, 2 December 1941, with amendments, TNA file WO 212/80.

A reorganisation of AA Command in October 1942 saw the AA divisions disbanded and replaced by a number of AA Groups more closely aligned with the groups of RAF Fighter Command. 6 AA Division merged into 2 AA Group covering South East England outside the London Inner Artillery Zone and cooperating with No. 11 Group.Pile's despatch.

Order of Battle 1941–43

During this period the brigade was composed as follows (temporary attachments omitted):Order of Battle of Non-Field Force Units in the United Kingdom, Part 27: AA Command, 1 October 1942, with amendments, TNA file WO 212/82.
 71st (Forth) HAA Rgt – from 29 AA Bde May 1942; left July 1942, later to Operation TorchRoutledge, Table XXX, p. 188.Litchfield, p. 283.
 227, 229, 327 HAA Btys
 75th HAA Rgt – left for Persia and Iraq Command (PAIFORCE) April 1942Joslen, p. 488.
 223, 233, 306 HAA  Btys
 422 HAA Bty – to 127th HAA Rgt, 28 AA Bde, April 1942
 84th HAA Rgt – joined Spring 1942; to 56 AA Bde August 1942
 260, 262, 263 HAA Btys
 86th (Honourable Artillery Company) HAA Rgt – joined August 1942; to Home Forces December 1942Order of Battle of the Field Force in the United Kingdom, Part 3: Royal Artillery (Non-Divisional Units), 18 February 1943, with amendments, TNA file WO 212/9.Litchfield, p. 149.
 273, 274, 383, 446 HAA Btys
 102nd HAA Rgt– joined August 1942; left for Middle East Forces (MEF) early 1943
 314, 315, 316 HAA Btys
 104th HAA Rgt – joined April 1942; to Sicily (Operation Husky) early 1943
 328, 329, 336 HAA Btys
 452 HAA Bty – joined June 1942; left July 1942
 121st HAA Rgt – joined April 1943
 385, 387, 388 HAA Btys
 124th HAA Rgt – joined early 1943, left May 1943
 219, 410, 412, 415 HAA Btys
 131st HAA Rgt – joined July 1942, to 4 AA Division August 1942
 310, 376, 368, 428 HAA Btys
 167th (Mixed) HAA Rgt – new unit formed August, joined September 1942
 464, 562 HAA Btys
 610, 639 HAA Btys – joined early 1943
 4th (Ulster) LAA Rgt – joined June 1942; unbrigaded October 1942, later to 27th (Home Counties) AA Bde
 7, 8, 10 LAA Boys
 11 LAA Bty – left July 1942
 31st LAA Rgt – joined June 1942; unbrigaded August 1942, later to Operation Husky31 LAA Rgt at RA 39–45.
 61, 101, 224 LAA Boys
 447 LAA Bty – left July 1942
 86th LAA Rgt – joined from 56 AA Bde April 1942; to MEF December 194286 LAA Rgt at RA 39–45.
 55, 119, 281, 475 LAA Btys
 140th LAA Rgt – new unit formed July joined August 1942; left early 1943
 367, 457, 459, 464 LAA Btys 
 143rd LAA Rgt – new unit formed October, joined early 1943
 403, 410, 413, 484 LAA Btys
 28th (Essex) S/L Rgt – from 29 AA Bde Spring 1942, to 56 AA Bde June 1942Litchfield, p. 69.
 309, 311, 312, 438 S/L Btys

Late War
In 1943 Brig Lancelot Perowne transferred from 69 AA Bde to take command of 37 AA Bde. He was a searchlight specialist from the Royal Engineers. In November 1943 he was sent to India to take over 23rd Infantry Brigade, which was training for Chindit operations, and commanded it in the Burma Campaign.

Order of Battle 1943–44
In the summer of 1943, 37 AA Bde came under the command of 1 AA Group, which now controlled the 'Thames North' defences. It gave up its existing regiments and acquired new ones from within 1 AA Group, so that by early September it had the following order of battle.
 184th (Mixed) HAA Rgt
 616, 617, 625, 627 HAA Btys
 6th (Mixed) AA 'Z' Regiment
 123, 145, 179, 187 Z Btys
 221 Z Bty – left by April 1944

'Z' Regiments were equipped with Z Battery rocket launchers; in April 1944 they were renamed  AA Area Mixed Rgts.

There were few changes in the brigade's order of battle over the next year:

 167th (M) HAA Rgt – returned May 1944
 464, 562, 610 HAA Btys
 137th LAA Rgt – joined January 1944
 326 LAA Bty – 26 (London) AA Bde May 1944
 376 LAA Bty
 462, 468 LAA Btys – left by March 1944
 205, 420 LAA Btys – joined May 1944

By March 1944 AA Command was being forced to release manpower for the planned Allied invasion of continental Europe (Operation Overlord), and a number of units and subunits were disbanded.

Operation Diver

The Luftwaffe began a new bombing campaign against London in early 1944 (the Baby Blitz).  By now the night fighter defences, the London Inner Artillery Zone (IAZ) and Thames Estuary defences were well organised and the attackers suffered heavy losses for relatively small results. More significant were the V-1 flying bombs, codenamed 'Divers', which began to be launched against London from Northern France soon after D-Day. These presented AA Command's biggest challenge since the Blitz. Defences had been planned against this new form of attack (Operation Diver), but it presented a severe problem for AA guns, and after two weeks' experience AA Command carried out a major reorganisation, stripping guns from the London IAZ and other parts of the UK and repositioning them along the South Coast to target V-1s coming in over the English Channel, where a 'downed' V-1 would cause no damage. As the launching sites were overrun by 21st Army Group, the Luftwaffe switched to air-launching V-1s over the North Sea, so 1 AA Group had to redeploy again to the east of London.Routledge pp. 408–21.

New HAA sites had to be quickly established, with static guns mounted on ingenious 'Pile Platforms' (named after the commander of AA Command, Sir Frederick Pile) and thousands of huts moved and re-erected to shelter the crews as winter approached. AA Command formed a new 9 AA Group to take over the 'Diver' defences in East Anglia and 37 AA Bde moved to this new formation in December 1944. At this time, its order of battle was:

Order of Battle 1944–45
 82nd (Essex) HAA Rgt – rejoined December 1944
 156, 193, 228 (Edinburgh), 256 HAA Btys
 124th HAA Rgt – rejoined March 1945
 219, 410, 412 HAA Btys
 142nd (M) HAA Rgt – joined September 1944
 477, 488, 534 HAA Btys
 464 HAA Bty – joined November 1944
 154th (M) HAA Rgt – joined February 1945
 522, 526, 539 HAA Btys
 155th (M) HAA Rgt – joined September, left December 1944
 525, 531, 537, 579 HAA Btys
 157th HAA Rgt – joined February, left March 1945
 415, 430, 438 HAA Btys
 159th (M) HAA Rgt – joined February 1945
 529, 542, 534 HAA Btys
 167th (M) HAA Rgt – left November 1944
 464, 562, 610 HAA Btys
 184th (M) HAA Rgt – left February 1945
 616, 617, 625 HAA Btys
 627 HAA Bty – left December 1944

 189th HAA Rgt – joined February 1945
 413, 434, 440 HAA Btys
 197th HAA Rgt – joined November 1944; left February 1945 
 603, 604, 605 HAA Btys
 81st LAA Rgt – joined October 1944; left February 1945
 199, 261 LAA Btys
 97th LAA Rgt – joined October 1944; left February 1945 
 232, 301, 480 LAA Boys
 131st LAA Rgt – joined February, left April 1945 
 432, 433, 434 LAA Btys
 137th LAA Rgt – left December 1944
 205, 376, 420 LAA Boys
 6th AA Area Mixed Rgt – to 26 (London) AA Bde August 1944

By October 1944, the brigade's HQ establishment was 9 officers, 8 male other ranks and 25 members of the ATS, together with a small number of attached drivers, cooks and mess orderlies (male and female). In addition, the brigade had a Mixed Signal Office Section of 1 officer, 5 male other ranks and 19 ATS, which was formally part of the Group signal unit.

After VE Day, 9 AA Group was disbanded and 37 AA Bde returned to 1 AA Group. AA Command was rapidly run down and many units disbanded as men and women were demobilised. By late June 1945, 37 AA Bde's order of battle was as follows:
 4th HAA Rgt – returned from North Africa
 5, 6, 258 HAA Btys
 82nd (Essex) HAA Rgt
 156, 193, 228, 256 HAA Btys
 124th HAA Rgt
 219, 410, 412 HAA Btys
 143rd (M) HAA Rgt
 494, 495 HAA Btys

Postwar
When the TA was reconstituted on 1 January 1947, 37 AA Bde's Regular Army units reformed 11 AA Bde at Shoeburyness, while the TA portion was renumbered as 63 (North London) AA Brigade, with its HQ at London NW1 (still in 1 AA Group), with the following composition:67–106 AA Bdes at British Army Units 1945 on.
 461 (Mobile) HAA Rgt (Middlesex)  – the former 61st (Middlesex) HAA Rgt, see above444–473 Rgts RA at British Army Units 1945 on.
 479 (Mobile) (Hertfordshire Yeomanry) HAA Rgt – the former 79th (Hertfordshire Yeomanry) HAA Rgt, see above, transferred from 82 AA Bde
 484 (Mixed) HAA Rgt (Middlesex)  – the former 84th (Middlesex, London Transport) HAA Rg, see above474–519 Rgts RA at British Army Units 1945 on.
 490 (Mixed) HAA Rgt (Middlesex) – the former 90th HAA Rgt, see above

When AA Command was disbanded in 1955, all of 63 AA Bde's units were also disbanded, but the brigade HQ was retained, first designated as X AA Bde, then redesignated as 33 AA Bde, with its HQ at Shepherd's Bush. It had the following composition:30–66 AA Bdes at British Army Units 1945 on.
 452 (London) HAA Rgt – the former 52nd (London) HAA RgtLitchfield, p. 164.
 459 (Essex) HAA Rgt – the former 59th (Essex Regiment) HAA Rgt, see above'''
 284 (1st East Anglian) LAA RgtLitchfield, p. 185.
 512 (Finsbury Rifles) LAA Rgt – descended from the former 61st (Middlesex) HAA Rgt', see aboveLitchfield, p. 168–9.
 517 (Essex) LAA Rgt – the former 17th LAA Rgt, see above
 571 (9th Bn Middlesex Regiment) LAA Rgt

It may have formed part of London District.

On 1 May 1961, 33 AA Bde was amalgamated with HQ 56th (London) Infantry Division as 33 Artillery Brigade. It was disbanded when the TA was reduced in 1967.

Preserved sites
As an example of the defences operated under 37 AA Bde, HAA site TN13 (Thames North 13) still survives at Bowaters Farm, about 1200 yards (1100 m) from the coastal defence battery at Coalhouse Fort, East Tilbury. It was begun in August 1939 as a sandbag battery for mobile 3.7-inch guns. By mid-1940 this had been replaced by four permanent emplacements for 4.5-inch guns. Later in the war  four further emplacements for radar-controlled 5.25-inch guns were added. The HAA guns were supported by an AA searchlight and sound-locator stationed on the jetty at Coalhouse Fort. This exposed position was defended by a Lewis gun, but was frequently strafed by enemy fighters. A second AA searchlight was positioned on the old river wall near the north caponier of Coalhouse Fort. (There were separate searchlights installed at the fort to direct the coastal guns.)Smith, pp. 26–7.

Memorial
There is a memorial to 37 AA Bde at St Augustine's Church, Thorpe Bay, Southend-on-Sea, which reads:

TO COMMEMORATE/ THE ASSOCIATION WITH THIS CHURCH OF THE/ OFFICERS, NON-COMMISSIONED OFFICERS AND/ OTHER RANKS OF THE ROYAL REGIMENT OF/ ARTILLERY AND THE AUXILIARY TERRITORIAL/ SERVICE FROM THE GUNSITE NEARBY WHICH WAS/ MANNED CONTINUOUSLY BY PERSONNEL FROM/ THE 37TH ANTI-AIRCRAFT BRIGADE THROUGHOUT/ THE WORLD WAR 1939 - 1945

Footnotes

Notes

References
 Basil Collier, History of the Second World War, United Kingdom Military Series: The Defence of the United Kingdom, London: HM Stationery Office, 1957.
 T. K. Derry, History of the Second World War: The Campaign in Norway, London, HM Stationery Office, 1952.
 Maj L. F. Ellis, History of the Second World War, United Kingdom Military Series: The War in France and Flanders 1939–1940, London: HM Stationery Office, 1954
 Gen Sir Martin Farndale, History of the Royal Regiment of Artillery: The Years of Defeat: Europe and North Africa, 1939–1941, Woolwich: Royal Artillery Institution, 1988/London: Brasseys, 1996, .
 J.B.M. Frederick, Lineage Book of British Land Forces 1660–1978, Vol II, Wakefield, Microform Academic, 1984, .
 
 Norman E. H. Litchfield, The Territorial Artillery 1908–1988 (Their Lineage, Uniforms and Badges), Nottingham: Sherwood Press, 1992, .
 Mike Osborne, 20th Century Defences in Britain: The London Area, Market Deeping: Concrete Publications, 2006, .
 Sir Frederick Pile's despatch: "The Anti-Aircraft Defence of the United Kingdom from 28th July, 1939, to 15th April, 1945" London Gazette 18 December 1947.
 Brig N. W. Routledge, History of the Royal Regiment of Artillery: Anti-Aircraft Artillery 1914–55, London: Royal Artillery Institution/Brassey's, 1994, .
 Col J.D. Sainsbury, The Hertfordshire Yeomanry Regiments, Royal Artillery, Part 2: The Heavy Anti-Aircraft Regiment 1938–1945 and the Searchlight Battery 1937–1945; Part 3: The Post-war Units 1947–2002, Welwyn: Hertfordshire Yeomanry and Artillery Trust/Hart Books, 2003, .
 Victor T. C. Smith, Coalhouse Fort and the Artillery Defences at East Tilbury: A History and Guide'', Thurrock: Coalhouse Fort Project, 1985.

External sources
 British Army units from 1945 on
 British Military History
 Generals of World War II
 Orders of Battle at Patriot Files
 The Royal Artillery 1939–45
 UK War Memorials Archive

Military units and formations established in 1939
Air defence brigades of the British Army
Anti-Aircraft brigades of the British Army in World War II
Military units and formations in London
Military units and formations disestablished in 1967